Madeline Stewart (born 2 August 2000) is a New Zealand racing driver in the Australian Super3 Series competing in a Holden VE II Commodore for Brad Jones Racing. Madeline stepped straight from racing go-karts to racing a V8 Supercar in 2019 and featured in the May 2019 edition of Supercars Life

Go-karting 

Madeline and her sister Ashleigh were well known in the Karting scene in both New Zealand and Australia. The Stewart Sisters Racing duo competed in on both sides of the Tasman in predominantly in Rotax based series before Madeline moved to KZ2 and Ashleigh to IAME X30.

Early years 
Madeline began racing go-karts at Kartsport Wellington in 2010 at the age of 9. She raced in the Cadet Class for two years with her most notable achievement being a win in her local club's annual enduro race in 2011. The race started on a wet track with Madeline, the only driver to start on slicks. She endured a tough start to the race falling a long way back before a late-race charge on a drying track saw her take the lead with one lap to go, winning by 10 seconds.

In 2012 Madeline moved up to the Junior Restricted class, which she did not enjoy and moved quickly up to Junior where she saw significant success including 2nd at the South Island Sprint Championships in 2015 and Pole position at the 2016 Kartsport New Zealand National Sprint Championship.

Australia 
In 2013, Madeline and her sister Ashleigh ventured across the Tasman for the first time to race in the Junior Rotax Trophy class at the Australian Rotax Pro-Tour. That was the start of a 4-year journey racing against the best karters in Australia. The challenge of racing in bigger and often more competitive fields than in New Zealand assisted greatly in the development of Madeline as a driver. In round 1 of the 2017 Rotax Pro-tour, Madeline took her maiden heat victory and her first podium. In round two of the series, Madeline went one better becoming the first female in the 17-year history of the Pro-Tour to win a round taking the 2017 South Australian State Title at the same time.

KZ2 
Towards the end of 2016, Madeline had her first taste of the ultimate in go-karting, the KZ2 kart competing in the final round of the 2016 Australian Kart Championship (AKC) before taking on the 2016 CIF FIA Asia Pacific Championship at Macau. She completed a full season of the Australian Kart Championship in 2017 with her best round finish of 10th in Emerald. In 2018 she added the New Zealand Pro-kart series to her KZ2 programme with a second-place at the 2018 Kart Sport New Zealand Nationals.

Madeline is also a two-time visitor to the US Supernationals in Las Vegas having competed in KZ2 in 2017 and 2018

Car Racing 
Madeline began her car racing career in 2019 stepping straight from go-karts to the third tier Supercar series Super3 Series with Brad Jones Racing To accelerate her learning she also raced in the Western Australian Formula 1000 State Championship.

Madeline intended to continue to race in the Super3 Series in 2020, with Brad Jones Racing as well as planning to race a Porsche 911 GT3 Cup Car in the Thailand Super Series with Earl Bamber Motorsport. The global COVID-19 pandemic changed those plans. Madeline completed in round 1 of the Super3 Championship at Sydney Motorsport Park finishing 3rd. She later competed in two rounds of the Aussie Tin Tops, a series created to give people an opportunity to race during the pandemic. Madeline won the Super3 class at Townsville before swapping to a Porsche 911 GT3 Cup Car with McElrea Racing for round 2 at The Bend Motorsport Park where she finished 4th in the Super Stuttgart class.

In 2021, Madeline became one of the inaugural Porsche New Zealand Scholarship recipients. The scholarship provides partial funding for her to race in the Porsche Sprint Challenge Australia in 2021 with Earl Bamber Motorsport/Porsche Team New Zealand.

Results

Super3 2019

References

New Zealand racing drivers
Supercars Championship drivers
2000 births
Living people
Female racing drivers